Mouth Maze Cave is a large, labyrinthine river cave in Trelawny, Jamaica. It is the only exit of the Mouth River from a small valley which, during intense rainfall, becomes flooded as the flow backs up. Because of this it can only safely be visited in very dry periods.

Natural history
The cave contains many invertebrates including, post hurricane Ivan, a termite nest.

See also
 List of caves in Jamaica
Jamaican Caves Organisation

References

External links
Aerial view.
Mouth Maze Cave - Jamaican Caves Organisation

Caves of Jamaica
Geography of Trelawny Parish
Caves of the Caribbean